The following is a list of mayors of the city of Porto Velho, in Rondônia state, Brazil.

 Fernando Guapindaia de Souza Brejense, 1915-1917 
 Joaquim Augusto Tanajura, 1917-1920 
 Raimundo Oliveira, 1920-1922 
 , 1922-1923	 
 Joaquim Augusto Tanajura, 1923-1925
 , 1925-1929
 Salustiano Liberato, 1929	
 Tófilo Marinho, 1929-1930	
 Raimundo Gonzaga Pinheiro, 1930-1931
 Arthur Napoleão Lebre, 1931-1932
 Ariosto Lopes Braga, 1932
 Francisco Plínio Coelho, 1932-1933
 Bohemundo Álvares Afonso, 1933
 José Ferreira Sobrinho, 1933-1938
 Francisco Guedes L. Fonseca, 1938
 Bohemundo Álvares Afonso, 1938-1943
 José Marques Galvão, 1943
 Mário Monteiro, 1943-1946
 Carlos Augusto de Mendonça, 1946-1947	
 José Otino de Freitas, 1947-1948	
 Celso Pinheiro, 1948	
 Flamínio de Júlio de Albuquerque, 1948	
 Rui Brasil Cantanhede, 1948-1951	
 Rafael Jaime Castiel, 1951	
 Balduíno Guedes de Lira, 1951-1954
 José Saleh Moreb, 1954-1955	
 Renato Climaco Borralho de Medeiros, 1955-1956	
 Walter Montezuma de Oliveira, 1956-1958
 Thomas Miguel Chaquian, 1958	
 Rubens Cantanhede, 1958-1961	
 Floriano Rodrigues Riva, 1961	
 Hamilton Raulino Gondim, 1961-1962	
 Homero Martins, 1962-1963	
 , 1963-1965, 1969-1972 
 Paulo Trajano de Medeiros, 1965-1967	
 Irineu Martins de Farias, 1967	
 Hebert Alencar de Souza, 1967	
 Hércules Lima de Carvalho, 1967	
 Walter Paula de Sales, 1967-1969		
 Jacob Freitas Atallah, 1972-1974	
 Emanuel Pontes Pinto, 1974-1975	
 , 1975-1976	
 Luis Gonzaga Farias Ferreira, 1976-1979	
 , 1979-1985	 
 , 1985-1986, 1993-1996	 
 Jerônimo Santana, 1986
 , 1986-1988
 , 1989-1992, 1997-1998	
 , 1998-2004	
 , 2005-2012
 , 2013-2016	
 , 2017-

See also
 
 List of mayors of largest cities in Brazil (in Portuguese)
 List of mayors of capitals of Brazil (in Portuguese)

References

This article incorporates information from the Portuguese Wikipedia.

Porto Velho
Porto Velho